InterVarsity Hockey refers to field hockey competitions in Australia between rival universities, dating back to 1908. The Men's and Women's competitions were organised and run separately until 1978, when they became a 'combined InterVarsity' (held at the same time and venue), before becoming part of the Australian University Games in 1993.

Beginnings 
The first InterVarsity match was played in 1908 when a team of women students from Melbourne University Hockey Club traveled to Adelaide, SA, to take on a team from The University of Adelaide. The visitors were entertained with a range of activities - a concert, a dance, a drive to the hills and a skating rink evening, and even a special fire brigade practice, with Adelaide winning the contest 3-1. A return match was played in 1909 on the Melbourne University Oval, and won by the home side 3-0.

The first Men's InterVarsity competition occurred in 1909, between students from Melbourne University Hockey Club and Sydney University Hockey Club, on the Melbourne University Oval. "An invitation was received from the Melbourne University to send a team over some time during the season, which was accepted after due consideration by the committee. It is probable that the visit will take place during the June vacation and a match en route against Wagga or Wangaratta may be arranged." This match was won by Melbourne, 6-2.

Women's InterVarsity Hockey

Early Results 
The first two Women's InterVarsity contests (1908 & 1909) were played between Melbourne and Adelaide, with the addition of Sydney in 1910 and The University of Queensland after World War I in 1919.

The University of Western Australia first competed in 1925 and The University of Tasmania in 1929, though both universities did not compete regularly until after World War II.

Women's Hockey Cup 

The Women's Hockey Cup is awarded to the Champion Women's University at InterVarsity Competition.

At the 1912 tournament, it was agreed that purchase of a trophy should be arranged, and the Melbourne University Sports Union was subsequently approached to provide £5 for this purpose. It was unable to assist, but the President of the Sports Union, Professor Baldwin Spencer (who had played hockey at Oxford, and been a key figure in the creation of the Melbourne University Hockey Club), offered to "see what could be done privately".

By the time of the next contest in 1914, a 'Championship Cup' had indeed be obtained. When Melbourne won it for the seventh time in 1926, they were deemed to have won the cup outright, however the following year they presented it to be used for perpetual competition.

The inscription reads:

Number of Wins

Competition format
The initial format was a head-to-head match between Melbourne and Adelaide. As the competition gradually expanded with the addition of the other sandstone universities, it became a simple round-robin format with the winner being the team with the most points. Whether by accident or design, the competition frequently came down to the final day of matches to determine the winner.

In 1925 Melbourne and Adelaide were tied on points, and an additional 'deciding match' was scheduled (won by Melbourne). When Melbourne and Queensland tied on points in 1936, the premiership was instead shared, but Melbourne retained the Women's Hockey Cup as they had won it the previous year. In 1946, Western Australia, Melbourne and Sydney all tied for first, with the trophy being awarded to Western Australia on the basis of goal difference (though Melbourne were the most recent winners, back in 1939).

With the number of competing universities increasing again from the 1960s onwards, the round-robin competition began to be split into two pools, followed by a knockout finals & classification series. As part of the Australian University Games, the round-robin-then-finals format has continued, but whether teams are split into pools varies from year-to-year. Also, depending on numbers the competition may be split into two divisions (based on rankings from the previous year), with the Women's Hockey Cup and overall InterVarsity premiership going to the winners of the 'Gold Medal match' in Division 1.

Men's InterVarsity Hockey

Early Results 
Initial competitions included only Melbourne and Sydney.

The annual match expanded to a triangular competition in 1924 with the addition of The University of Queensland, and then further when Adelaide joined in 1928. The University of Western Australia first competed in 1934 and The University of Tasmania in 1947.

The Syme Cup 

The Syme Cup is awarded to the Champion Men's University at InterVarsity Competition. It was awarded for the first time in 1925, having been donated by Sir George Adlington Syme, the President of Melbourne University Hockey Club.

The inscription reads:

The Cup is affectionately known as "Georgie".

Number of Wins

Competition format
The initial format was a challenge match between Melbourne and Sydney, with the title retained by the holder in the case of a draw (as in 1912 and 1919). As the competition gradually expanded with the addition of the other sandstone universities, it became a simple round-robin format with the winner being the team with the most points. In the case of multiple teams being tied on points, they would share the premiership, but the Syme Cup was still awarded on a challenge basis; If the holder was one of the joint-winners they would retain the cup, otherwise each of the winners would share custody of it over the year.

After a three-way tie in 1936, it was decided that goal average would be taken into account in determining the winner of the Syme Cup. Joint-winners continued to be declared after World War II, though it is unclear if this was a deliberate or accidental change in policy.

With the number of competing universities increasing again from the 1960s onwards, the round-robin competition began to be split into two pools, followed by a knockout finals & classification series. As part of the Australian University Games, the round-robin-then-finals format has continued, but whether teams are split into pools varies from year-to-year. Also, depending on numbers the competition may be split into two divisions (based on rankings from the previous year), with the Syme Cup and overall InterVarsity premiership going to the winners of the 'Gold Medal match' in Division 1.

Combined University Teams
As an extension of the Intervarsity Hockey Championships, a representative team was typically named at the conclusion of the carnival. This was known as the Combined Universities Team, or the Australian Universities Team. In years gone by, this combined team would tour New Zealand on a biannual basis and/or play matches against the open state teams of the day. The combined team would often play the Host State's Open State team at the immediate end of the Intervarsity carnival. The last of the New Zealand Tours occurred in the 1980s. Selection in the Combined Universities Team was considered an excellent achievement and many State and even National players have been chosen for these teams.

With the advent of Australian University Games in 1993, the format of naming a 'representative' team was replaced whereby Australian University Sport would name a Green and Gold Merit team. This was essentially done under the same pretence as the Combined University Team, with the best players at the carnival chosen for what is now known as the 'Green and Gold Team'. This team, however, is ceremonious in nature only and does not compete in any matches.

Boat Races
For many years, Boat Races were a formal part of InterVarsity, with heats and finals held throughout the week, and the 'West End Cup' (men) and 'Chuckle Pot' (women) being awarded to the winners.

Summer InterVarsity Hockey
From 1967 until at least the mid 1980s, a 'Summer InterVarsity' for both Men and Women was also arranged, typically around Australia Day.

The inscription on the trophy reads:

Results are engraved from 1967 until 1980. The trophy is currently held by Melbourne.

Known results:

See also
Varsity Hockey (South Africa)

Notes

References 

Melbourne University Hockey Club - List of InterVarsity Results

Field hockey competitions in Australia
Hockey
1908 establishments in Australia
Sports leagues established in 1908
Hockey